Villar San Costanzo is a comune (municipality) in the Province of Cuneo in the Italian region Piedmont, located about  southwest of Turin and about  northwest of Cuneo.

Sights to see in Villar San Costanzo include the natural reserve known as Ciciu del Villar; the Abbey built in early 700 AD; and the very ancient church of San Costanzo al Monte, a stunning example of Romanesque-Gothic architecture dating back to the 12th century.  The town takes its name from Saint Constantius, a soldier of the Theban Legion, who is said to have been beheaded at the spot now occupied by the sanctuary of San Costanzo al Monte.  The local geologic formation known as Ciciu del Villar, which are columns formed by natural erosion, was connected with Constantius' legend: the stones are said to be the Roman soldiers sent to kill him, who were miraculously petrified before they could harm the saint.

Villar San Costanzo borders the following municipalities: Busca, Dronero and Roccabruna.

Demographic evolution

Twin towns — sister cities
Villar San Costanzo is twinned with:

  Rosières, Haute-Loire, France

References

External links
 www.comune.villarsancostanzo.cn.it/

Cities and towns in Piedmont